Nebularia eremitarum (common name: adusta mitre) is a species of sea snail, a marine gastropod mollusk in the family Mitridae, the miters or miter snails.

Description
The shell size varies between 38 mm and  86 mm

Distribution
This species is distributed in the Red Sea and in the Pacific Ocean along Fiji, Papua New Guinea and the Philippines.

References

 Cernohorsky W. O. (1976). The Mitrinae of the World. Indo-Pacific Mollusca 3(17) page(s): 324

eremitarum
Gastropods described in 1798